Amalda whatmoughi is a species of sea snail, a marine gastropod mollusk in the family Ancillariidae.

References

External links

whatmoughi
Gastropods described in 1993